Alan Hyde Gardner, 2nd Baron Gardner KCB (5 February 1770 – 22 December 1815), was a British admiral.

Naval career
Born the son of Admiral Alan Gardner, 1st Baron Gardner, he followed his father into the Royal Navy. In 1796 he was captain of the frigate , in 1802 he was captain of Resolution, and in 1805 of the 74-gun  – in the latter he was present at the action off Ferrol in 1805, and led the vanguard at the Battle of Cape Finisterre later that year.

In 1815 it was announced that he was to be created a viscount, but he died before the patent had passed the Great Seal.  He passed on the title of Baron Gardner to his son, Alan.

Marriage and issue 
His first marriage was on 9 March 1796 to Maria Elizabeth Adderley, the daughter of Thomas Adderley and his wife Margaretta Bourke, later Baroness Hobart (d. 1796), and stepdaughter since 1792 of Robert, Baron Hobart, the future Secretary of State for War and the Colonies 1801–04. The couple divorced in 1805, after Lord Gardner discovered his wife's adultery and secret delivery of a child in June 1803, and brought about an ecclesiastical suit followed by an Act of Parliament, citing her adultery with a Henry Jadis (the father of her son born in 1803, Henry Fenton Gardner, who was declared illegitimate by the House of Lords in 1825). According to the Treatise on Adulterine Bastardy, the divorced Mrs Gardner married her lover immediately afterwards, and they raised Henry Fenton as their own child and with the Jadis surname.  
His second marriage (as 2nd Baron Gardner) was on 10 April 1809 to Charlotte Elizabeth Smith (d. 27 March 1811), third daughter of Robert Smith, 1st Baron Carrington, and his wife Anne Boldero-Barnard.  The couple had one son Alan (29 January 1810 – 2 November 1883) and one daughter, Hon. Charlotte Susannah Gardner (29 December 1810 – 15 August 1859), m. 1835 Edward Vernon Harbord, 4th Lord Suffield (1813–1853) without issue. These children were "Irish twins" (born in the same calendar year, and within twelve months of each other); Lady Gardner died three months later.

The 2nd Baron Gardner inherited his father's barony and baronetcy in 1809.  He died 1815, leaving legitimate issue. Efforts were made in 1824 to seat his son as a peer, and to ensure that Fenton Gardner (son of Lord Gardner's first wife) would not inherit the peerage.  The subsequent proceeding in the House of Lords established that Alan Legge Gardner was the 3rd Baron Gardner, and that his (alleged) half-brother was in fact illegitimate. The proceedings heard evidence from domestic servants and also medical practitioners, testifying to the possible lengths of human gestation; the medical evidence also received an eccentric contemporary commentary by Robert Lyall. This commentary includes an science-fictional experiment to calculate the exact length of human gestation, which Lyall calls the Experimental Conception Hospital.

References

External links 
 The Peerage
 Links to the evidence and other resources for studying the Gardner Peerage dispute 1825-6.

1770 births
1815 deaths
Royal Navy admirals
Barons in the Peerage of the United Kingdom
Barons in the Peerage of Ireland
Eldest sons of British hereditary barons